PEPA is a sulfonamide AMPA receptor positive allosteric modulator, which is up to 100 times more potent than aniracetam in vitro. It produces memory-enhancing effects in rats when administered intravenously.

See also 
 AMPA receptor positive allosteric modulator

References 

Acetamides
Phenol ethers
Fluoroarenes
Thioethers
Sulfonamides
AMPA receptor positive allosteric modulators